Franco Pivoli (born 11 September 1948) is an Italian sailor. He competed in the Tornado event at the 1976 Summer Olympics.

References

External links
 

1948 births
Living people
Italian male sailors (sport)
Olympic sailors of Italy
Sailors at the 1976 Summer Olympics – Tornado
Sportspeople from Milan